Lynge is a town in the western part of Allerød Municipality, North Zealand,  some 30 km north of Copenhagen, Denmark. Today Lynge has grown together with the neighbouring village of Uggeløse into a small urban area with a population of 4,163 (1 January 2022).

History
The first known reference to the name Lynge is in a gift letter from Canute the Holy to the Bishop Seat in Lund. The reference is to Lynge Herred but hundreds were usually named after settlements.. That the hundred was named after Lynge may indicate that the medieval road from Roskilde to central North Zealand by way of Værebro also passed Lynge.

In the 12th and 13th century, the area was dominated by the influential Hvide family. A fortified house, Langesøhus (later referred to as Borre), owned by the family, was in the Middle Ages located south of present-day Uggeløse Skov. The Hvide family seems to have left the area in about 1300. The first known reference to Uggeløse is from 15 October 1252.

Administratively, the villages of Lynge and Uggeløse were already merged into Lynge-Uggeløse Sognekommune in 1842.

Lynge station opened on the new, private Copenhagen-Slangerup Railway in 1906 and a new Lynge School was built in 1910 to design byJesper Tvede. The station closed on  23 May 1954 when the section from Farum to Slangerup was decommissioned.

With the 1970 Danish Municipal Reform it became part of Allerød Municipality.

Landmarks
Lynge and Uggeløse churches are both Romanesque village churches from about 1200. Lynge Church contains frescos (kalkmalerier) by the Issefjord Workshop.

The hearing aid manufacturer Widex is headquartered in Lynge.

Notable people
 Knud Rasmussen (1879–1933) anthropologist, polar explorer, partly grew up in Lynge
 Jan Gintberg (born 1963 in Lynge) standup comedian and television personality 
 Morten Jensen (born 1982 in Lynge) track athlete, competed in 2008 Olympic Games

References

External links
 Lynge gennem 90 pr

Allerød Municipality